Red & White is an extended play by American rapper Lil Uzi Vert. It was released on July 22, 2022, and was previewed through several singles on SoundCloud starting from July 16, 2022. The EP marks their first solo body of work since March 2020's Eternal Atake.

Uzi announced the project and revealed its cover artwork via their Instagram on July 12, 2022.

Release
The EP’s first lead single "Space Cadet" released on Uzi's SoundCloud on July 16, 2022. The second promotional single, "I Know", was released on their SoundCloud two days later. The third promotional single, "Flex Up" was released the next day.

Red & White’s final promotional single, "Hittin My Shoulder" was released via SoundCloud on July 20, 2022, whilst the EP's first single, "Space Cadet", became available on all streaming platforms.

Within the first few hours of July 22, 2022, five more tracks were periodically released through Uzi's SoundCloud. The EP was then released onto all streaming platforms a few hours later, which omitted the four promotional singles and included a new song, "Cigarette".

On July 25, 2022, "Cigarette" was added onto the SoundCloud release of the EP. The next day, the four promotional singles were added onto the streaming version of the EP, and Uzi confirmed the completion of the EP's tracks after.

Track listing

Notes 
"Believe Me" is omitted from the streaming release of the EP, because the copyright of the sample is not settled.
"Final Fantasy" is stylized as "F.F." on the streaming release of the EP. 

Sample credits
"Final Fantasy" contains samples from "Blinded by Light (From "Final Fantasy XIII")" performed by Masashi Hamauzu.
"Believe Me" contains samples from the song "Sezam" ("Sesame") music by Maria  Ganeva, lyrics D. Kerelezov, performed by rock band "Sezam" ("Sesame") from Bulgaria.

Charts

References

2022 EPs
Lil Uzi Vert albums
Atlantic Records EPs
Cloud rap albums